Tylor Golden (born 8 November 1999) is an American professional soccer player who plays as a defender for FC Halifax Town.

Club career

Early career and Wigan Athletic
Born in Myrtle Beach, South Carolina to parents Tony and Tania, Golden moved to Ipswich, England in 2008 and spent a year with Ipswich Town alongside his brother Deven. After spells with Manchester City, Rochdale and Blackburn Rovers, Golden joined Wigan Athletic in 2014, and was included as a substitute for the senior team for the first time for a match against Scunthorpe United in October 2017. He made his first-team debut during their EFL Trophy tie against Middlesbrough U23s later in the month, setting up a goal for mentor Noel Hunt in a 4–1 victory. Golden signed his first professional contract in April 2018. In 2019, he had spells on loan at Droylsden, where he made four appearances, and Nantwich Town before being released by Wigan at the end of June 2020.

Salford City
On 31 August 2020, it was announced that Golden had joined the development squad of League Two side Salford City. He made his competitive début for the club on 9 September in an EFL Trophy game against Manchester United Under-21s. Golden made his Football League début on 26 September, playing the whole match and helping to keep a clean sheet in a 0–0 draw against Forest Green Rovers, and he received praise from manager Graham Alexander for his "flawless" performance.

On 22 February 2021, Golden joined National League side Notts County on a one-month loan deal. He made only one appearance for County, against Oxford City in the FA Trophy, where he scored an own-goal and was criticised for his performance by County fans. During the match, Golden suffered an injury and eventually returned to Salford at the end of April without playing another match.

He was released by Salford at the end of the 2021–22 season.

FC Halifax Town
In July 2022 he signed for FC Halifax Town.

Style of play
Former Salford manager Graham Alexander has described him as a player who sticks to his defensive tasks but who enjoys going forward and being directly involved in the game, as well as showing the "right enthusiasm and attitude towards the game". Neil Eardley, his manager at Notts County, said he was a player who would "run up and down that line as much as he physically can" and that he is "physically robust, puts himself about and defends for his life".

Career statistics

References

External links

1999 births
Living people
People from Myrtle Beach, South Carolina
American soccer players
English footballers
American people of English descent
Association football defenders
Wigan Athletic F.C. players
Droylsden F.C. players
Nantwich Town F.C. players
Salford City F.C. players
Notts County F.C. players
FC Halifax Town players
English Football League players
Northern Premier League players